Juan David Tejada Londono (born 14 January 1997) is a Panamanian footballer who plays as a forward for Indy Eleven in the USL Championship.

Career

Youth and college 
Tejada played with the youth academy of Chepo F.C. in his native Panama starting from U–15 before moving to the United States on a scholarship to play for IMG Academy in Bradenton, Florida.

After graduating from IMG, Tejada began playing collegiately for the Eckerd Tritons in St. Petersburg, Florida. During his time at Eckerd, Tejada started every game for the Tritons all four years he played there.

Club

Lakeland Tropics
Tejada played in the USL PDL in 2017 and 2018, starring as an attacking midfielder or forward for the Lakeland Tropics. In 2018, while playing alongside some of the Tropics' MASL professionals, Tejada led the team in scoring with 7 goals in 11 appearances.

Tampa Bay Rowdies
In early 2019, Tejada joined the local Tampa Bay Rowdies as a preseason trialist. He scored in a closed–door friendly against the UCF Knights and impressed coaches and fans alike with his work rate against Major League Soccer's D.C. United before being rewarded with a professional contract on February 20. Tejada added a second preseason tally against the Georgia Southern Eagles and then started for the Rowdies in the opening match of the 2019 USL Championship season. Tejada scored 14 goals in 75 appearances during his time with the Rowdies.

Indy Eleven
On July 21, 2022, Tejada was traded by Tampa Bay to Indy Eleven in exchange for midfielder Nicky Law.

International
Tejada played at several junior levels for Panama. He was called up to the senior team in November 2020 for friendlies scheduled to take place in Europe. He subsequently made his debut against the US national team, playing the first half of a 6-2 loss on November 16.

Honours
Tampa Bay Rowdies
 USL Championship Regular Season Title: 2021

References

External links 
 

1997 births
Living people
Sportspeople from Panama City
Panamanian footballers
Panamanian expatriate sportspeople in the United States
IMG Academy alumni
Eckerd Tritons men's soccer players
Lakeland Tropics players
Tampa Bay Rowdies players
Indy Eleven players
Association football forwards
USL League Two players
USL Championship players
Panamanian expatriate footballers
Expatriate soccer players in the United States
Panama youth international footballers
Panama international footballers